The Arado E.561 was a proposed Heavy fighter design by Arado Flugzeugwerke, designed in 1937 and 1938.

Design
The craft contained a cigar-shaped fuselage with low-mounted wings. Unusually, it contained two engines mounted in the junction of the wing and the fuselage, as opposed to on the wings, to allow it to continue running if one engine failed. This also would allow a sleeker and more aerodynamic design. Two annular radiators were present on front of the propellers. It had two landing wheels, both of which could retract. It was crewed by four people. It is likely that the complicated design of the engine was what caused the abandonment of the project.

References

Arado aircraft